Anderson–Foster House, also known as Foster Place and Sunnyside, is a historic home located near Holly Grove, Louisa County, Virginia. It was built about 1856, and is  Greek Revival style dwelling.

It was listed on the National Register of Historic Places in 1978.

References

Houses on the National Register of Historic Places in Virginia
Greek Revival houses in Virginia
Houses completed in 1856
Houses in Louisa County, Virginia
National Register of Historic Places in Louisa County, Virginia
1856 establishments in Virginia